Levashovo is a rural locality (a village) in Florishchinskoye Rural Settlement, Kolchuginsky District, Vladimir Oblast, Russia. The population was 15 as of 2010.

Geography 
Levashovo is located 19 km west of Kolchugino (the district's administrative centre) by road. Florishchi is the nearest rural locality.

References 

Rural localities in Kolchuginsky District